"Young Folks" is the first single from Swedish band Peter Bjorn and John's third album, Writer's Block (released in 2006). The single features Victoria Bergsman as a guest vocalist. The song received generally positive reviews from critics and performed well in the record charts, reaching the top 40 in Canada, the Czech Republic, Finland, Germany, Hungary, Ireland, and the United Kingdom. A music video made for the song features animated versions of Peter and Bergsman performing the song in various locations.

Reception
The song first attracted notice on websites such as Myspace and YouTube, and was used in a number of European commercials and television shows. Since mid-2007, the song has earned extensive airplay on American radio, most notably on dance radio outlets like KNHC/Seattle, KNGY/San Francisco and Sirius Satellite's The Beat. It is notable for being a popular song with whistling (the whistling was originally added in as a placeholder for another instrument). The whistling and part of the song have a tune reminiscent of the "oriental riff".

The song was ranked No. 5 on Pitchfork Medias Top 100 Tracks of 2006 list. Pitchfork reviewed the song on 19 July 2006, giving it three out of five stars. The song was also voted No. 2 in the 2006 NME Track of the Year poll. Planet Sound named this their No. 2 single of 2006. The song was named the No. 1 song of 2007 according to the iTunes Store. Y-Rock on XPN also named the song No. 1 of 2007. In October 2011, NME placed it at No. 92 on its list 150 Best Tracks of the Past 15 Years. It was included in Spinner's 10 Best Whistling Parts in Songs. Rolling Stone put the song also on its list of the 15 Best Whistling Songs of All Time.

The single was re-released on 17 September 2007, reaching No. 13 in the United Kingdom, beating the original chart position of No. 33 in 2006.

Music video
The animated video for the song was directed by Ted Malmros with animation by Graham Samuels. It is featured in the video game SingStar Pop 2, as well as in Lips.

The video starts off with Peter and Victoria sitting in a park, on a bench. Peter teaches Victoria how to whistle. Then the video switches over to them both sitting in a bus where the song starts. Throughout the video, scenes of the band playing the song can be seen and eventually the video ends with a big party where everybody "seems to disappear".

Live performances
The group performed the song on Late Night with Conan O'Brien on 29 January 2007, and on The Tonight Show with Jay Leno on 18 May 2007 (the latter with Tonight Show band member Vicki Randle on bongos). On 29 September 2007, the band played "Young Folks", with Victoria Bergsman's vocals, on Friday Night with Jonathan Ross on BBC1. When the band performed the song at the 2007 Coachella Valley Music and Arts Festival, Bergsman's vocals were performed by Bebban Stenborg of Shout Out Louds. On Peter Bjorn and John's 2008 Australian tour, Victoria Bergsman's vocals were performed by Tracyanne Campbell of Camera Obscura.

Track listings
7-inch single
A. "Young Folks" (featuring Victoria Bergsman)
B. "Ancient Curse"

2006 CD single
 "Young Folks" (featuring Victoria Bergsman)
 "Ancient Curse"
 "All Those Expectations" (weak mix)

2007 CD single
 "Young Folks" (featuring Victoria Bergsman)
 "Young Folks" (OrtzRoka remix)
 "Young Folks" (Beyond the Wizards Sleeve re-animation)

Charts

Weekly charts

Year-end charts

Certifications

In popular culture
"Young Folks" has made numerous appearances in media. German singer Nena covered "Young Folks" together with Oliver Pocher and Stephan Remmler in the German language as "Ich kann nix dafür" ("I'm not responsible for it.") for the movie Vollidiot. This version was the 78th-best-selling single of 2007 in Germany.

See also
 Whistling#In music

References

2006 songs
2006 singles
Animated music videos
English-language Swedish songs
The Kooks songs
Male–female vocal duets
Peter Bjorn and John songs
Songs written by Björn Yttling
Wichita Recordings singles